Fahima Khatun (born 2 November 1992) is a Bangladeshi cricketer who plays for the Bangladesh women's national cricket team. In May 2018, in a 50 over tour match in South Africa, she took eight wickets for five runs in ten overs. She was the first cricketer for Bangladesh to take a hat-trick in a Women's Twenty20 International match.

Career
In June 2018, she was part of Bangladesh's squad that won their first ever Women's Asia Cup title, winning the 2018 Women's Twenty20 Asia Cup tournament. Later the same month, she was named in Bangladesh's squad for the 2018 ICC Women's World Twenty20 Qualifier tournament. In the tournament match against the United Arab Emirates on 10 July 2018, she took her first hat-trick in WT20Is.

In October 2018, she was named in Bangladesh's squad for the 2018 ICC Women's World Twenty20 tournament in the West Indies. In August 2019, she was named in Bangladesh's squad for the 2019 ICC Women's World Twenty20 Qualifier tournament in Scotland. In November 2019, she was named in Bangladesh's squad for the cricket tournament at the 2019 South Asian Games. The Bangladesh team beat Sri Lanka by two runs in the final to win the gold medal.

In January 2020, she was named in Bangladesh's squad for the 2020 ICC Women's T20 World Cup in Australia. In November 2021, she was named in Bangladesh's team for the 2021 Women's Cricket World Cup Qualifier tournament in Zimbabwe. In January 2022, she was named in Bangladesh's team for the 2022 Commonwealth Games Cricket Qualifier tournament in Malaysia. Later the same month, she was named in Bangladesh's team for the 2022 Women's Cricket World Cup in New Zealand.

Education
She is a student of the Law department at Islamic University, Bangladesh in Kushtia.

References

External links

 
 

1992 births
Living people
Place of birth missing (living people)
People from Magura District
Bangladeshi women cricketers
Bangladesh women One Day International cricketers
Bangladesh women Twenty20 International cricketers
Asian Games medalists in cricket
Cricketers at the 2014 Asian Games
Asian Games silver medalists for Bangladesh
Medalists at the 2014 Asian Games
South Asian Games gold medalists for Bangladesh
South Asian Games medalists in cricket
Islamic University, Bangladesh alumni
Women's Twenty20 International cricket hat-trick takers
Barisal Division women cricketers
Khulna Division women cricketers
Chittagong Division women cricketers
Western Zone women cricketers